The International University of Management (IUM) is a private, state-recognized university based in Windhoek, Namibia. It has campuses in Swakopmund, Walvis Bay, Ongwediva and Nkurenkuru.

History
The university was founded by David Namwandi in 1994 with one professor and one student in Windhoek North. Namwandi also served as IUM's vice-chancellor from 2001 until he was appointed deputy Minister of Education in 2010. The IUM vice-chancellor position was taken over by Namwandi's wife, Virginia.

In 2002 IUM it was accorded university status. It opened another campus in the Dorado Park neighbourhood of Windhoek in April 2011. President Hifikepunye Pohamba applauded the university's expansion and called for further public-private partnership in tertiary education.

Programs
The university offers Bachelor and Master programs in strategic management information technology, human resources, travel, tourism, and hospitality, business information systems, business administration, finance management, HIV/Aids management and other subjects.

Notable alumni 

 Pendukeni Ivula-Ithana holds an MBA from IUM

References

External links
 Official website International University of Management

Education in Windhoek
Educational institutions established in 1994
Universities in Namibia
1994 establishments in Namibia